The 2021 AIBA Youth World Boxing Championships (21st) were held in Kielce, Poland, from 13 to 23 April 2021. The competition was held under the supervision of AIBA, the world's governing body for amateur boxing, and was open to boxers born in 2002 and 2003. It was the third time in the tournament's history that men and women have fought in the same championship. India topped the medal table with eight gold and three bronze medals.

Schedule

Events Boxers

Medal summary

Men

Women

Medal table

Participating nations
A total of 414 competitors from 52 nations (32 Europe, 11 Asia, 7 Americas, 2 Africa) participated.

See also
 2021 AIBA World Boxing Championships

References

External links
AIBA
Results book

Youth, 2021
Youth World Boxing Championships
AIBA
AIBA
International boxing competitions hosted by Poland
Sport in Kielce
AIBA